There have been two baronetcies created for members of the Bellew family, one in the Baronetage of Ireland and one in the Baronetage of the United Kingdom. Both creations are extant as of 2008.

The Bellew Baronetcy, of Barmeath in the County of Louth, was created in the Baronetage of Ireland on 11 December 1688. For more information on this creation, see the Baron Bellew.

The Bellew, later Grattan-Bellew Baronetcy, of Mount Bellew in the County of Galway, was created in the Baronetage of the United Kingdom on 15 August 1838. For more information on this creation, see Grattan-Bellew baronets.

Bellew baronets, of Barmeath (1688)
see Baron Bellew

Bellew, later Grattan-Bellew baronets, of Mount Bellew (1838)
see Grattan-Bellew baronets

References

Baronetcies in the Baronetage of Ireland
Baronetcies in the Baronetage of the United Kingdom